Thelymitra fuscolutea, commonly called the chestnut sun orchid, is a species of orchid in the family Orchidaceae and is endemic to the south-west of Western Australia. It has a single erect, flat, leathery leaf and up to fifteen or more yellowish green flowers with reddish brown streaks and blotches. The column has broad, deeply fringed cream or whitish wings.

Description
The lobe on the top of the anther has a club-like lobe on its top. The flowers are insect pollinated and open on sunny days. Flowering occurs from November to January.

Taxonomy and naming
Thelymitra fuscolutea was first formally described in 1810 by Robert Brown and the description was published in Prodromus Florae Novae Hollandiae et Insulae Van Diemen. The specific epithet (fuscolutea) is derived from the Latin words fuscus meaning "dark" or "dusky" and lutea meaning "yellow" referring to the colour of the flowers.

Distribution and habitat
The chestnut sun orchid grows in heath, forest and on the edges of winter-wet swamps. It occurs between Perth and the Cape Arid National Park.

Conservation
Thelymitra fuscolutea is classified as "not threatened" by the Western Australian Government Department of Parks and Wildlife.

References

External links
 

fuscolutea
Endemic orchids of Australia
Orchids of Western Australia
Plants described in 1810